Jules Yao Bessan  (born 14 April 1979) is a Beninese Olympic swimmer. He represented his country at the 2016 Summer Olympics in the 50 metre freestyle event where he placed 77th with a time of 27.32 seconds. He did not advance to the semifinals.

Bessan holds the Beninese national record in 50 metre freestyle and 50 metre breaststroke.

References 

1979 births
Living people
Beninese male swimmers
Swimmers at the 2016 Summer Olympics
Olympic swimmers of Benin
People from Cotonou
Beninese male freestyle swimmers
Male breaststroke swimmers